The Greater Magaric languages are a branch of Sino-Tibetan languages proposed by Nicolas Schorer (2016). Schorer (2016: 286-287) considers Greater Magaric to be closely related to the Kiranti languages as part of a greater Himalayish branch, and does not consider Himalayish to be particularly closely related to the Tibetic languages, which include Tibetan and the Tamangic languages.

Matisoff (2015: xxxii, 1123-1127), in the final print release of the Sino-Tibetan Etymological Dictionary and Thesaurus (STEDT), has also proposed a Kham-Magar-Chepang language group.

Classification
Schorer (2016:293) classifies the Greater Magaric languages as follows.
Greater Magaric
Dura
Dura
Tandrange
Magaric: Kham, Magar
Chepangic-Raji
Chepangic: Chepang, Bhujel
Raji-Raute: Raji, Raute, Rawat

References

Schorer, Nicolas. 2016. The Dura Language: Grammar and Phylogeny. Leiden: Brill.

Further reading
Watters, David E. 2003. Some preliminary observations on the relationship between Kham, Magar, (and Chepang). SIL International Language and Culture Archives.